Mudrike is  populated place in Bosnia and Herzegovina, Travnik Municipality.

Climate
In Mudrike there is a typical Mountain Climate of Central Bosnia.

Population

See also
Ugar
Vlašić
Pljačkovac

References

Populated places in Travnik
Villages in the Federation of Bosnia and Herzegovina